Hattingspruit was established in the 1880s as a coal mining town in KwaZulu-Natal, South Africa. It is situated on the banks of the Tom Worthington Dam. The Farmers Brewery, a modern brewery that brews traditional Austrian and German ales, was established here.

References

Populated places in the Dannhauser Local Municipality
Mining communities in South Africa